Tamil Nadu is home to some of the most reputed institutes for higher education in India. Arts and science colleges include Madras Christian College, Loyola College, Chennai, Presidency College, Chennai, Pachaiyappa's College, Dr. N.G.P. Arts and Science College, PSG College of Arts and Science, Government Arts College, Coimbatore, St Joseph's College, Tiruchirappalli, National College, Tiruchirappalli and American College, Madurai. Management education institutes include the Bharathidasan Institute of Management, Great Lakes Institute of Management, Loyola Institute of Business Administration, PSG Institute of Management Coimbatore and Indian Institute of Management Tiruchirappalli. 

Engineering institutes include the Indian Institute of Technology Madras, National Institute of Technology Tiruchirappalli, Indian Institute of Information Technology, Design and Manufacturing, Kancheepuram, College of Engineering Guindy, PSG College of Technology, Madras Institute of Technology, Alagappa College of Technology, Coimbatore Institute of Technology, Government College of Technology, Coimbatore SSN College of Engineering, Vellore Institute of Technology, SRM Institute of Science and Technology, Amrita Vishwa Vidyapeetham and SASTRA University. Institutes for medical education include Christian Medical College Vellore, Madras Medical College, Stanley Medical College, Sri Ramachandra Institute of Higher Education and Research and PSG Institute of Medical Sciences & Research.

Universities

State universities

Deemed to be universities

Autonomous institutes

State and central government joint support institutes

Colleges affiliated to universities

Constituent colleges of universities

See also
 List of Tamil Nadu Government educational institutions
List of Tamil Nadu Government Medical Colleges
 List of Tamil Nadu Government Arts and Science Colleges

References

External links
Colleges in Tamil Nadu
Colleges in Tamil Nadu, Tamil Nadu Government official website